Parathesis panamensis is a species of plant in the family Primulaceae. It is found in Colombia and Panama.

References

panamensis
Data deficient plants
Taxonomy articles created by Polbot